English number words include numerals and various words derived from them, as well as a large number of words borrowed from other languages.

Cardinal numbers 
Cardinal numbers refer to the size of a group. In English, these words are numerals.

If a number is in the range 21 to 99, and the second digit is not zero, the number is typically written as two words separated by a hyphen.

In English, the hundreds are perfectly regular, except that the word hundred remains in its singular form regardless of the number preceding it.

So too are the thousands, with the number of thousands followed by the word "thousand". For the number one thousand it may be written 1 000 or 1000 or 1,000, for larger numbers they are written for example 10 000 or 10,000 for ease of human reading. As a result some style guides recommend avoidance of the comma as a separator and only to use the period (.) as a decimal placement. Thus a half would be written 0.5 in decimal, base ten notation, and fifty thousand as 50 000, and not 50.000 nor 50,000 nor 50000. As the English language has no language academy to make usage correct there is still a wide variety of usage, other languages do have language academies which ruled on these matters, yet their rulings are deprecated by international standards like the SI system or EU recommendations which leads to varied usage.

In American usage, four-digit numbers are often named using multiples of "hundred" and combined with tens and ones: "eleven hundred three", "twelve hundred twenty-five", "forty-seven hundred forty-two", or "ninety-nine hundred ninety-nine." In British usage, this style is common for multiples of 100 between 1,000 and 2,000 (e.g. 1,500 as "fifteen hundred") but not for higher numbers.

Americans may pronounce four-digit numbers with non-zero tens and ones as pairs of two-digit numbers without saying "hundred" and inserting "oh" for zero tens: "twenty-six fifty-nine" or "forty-one oh five". This usage probably evolved from the distinctive usage for years; "nineteen-eighty-one", or from four-digit numbers used in the American telephone numbering system which were originally two letters followed by a number followed by a four-digit number, later by a three-digit number followed by the four-digit number. It is avoided for numbers less than 2500 if the context may mean confusion with time of day: "ten ten" or "twelve oh four".

Intermediate numbers are read differently depending on their use. Their typical naming occurs when the numbers are used for counting. Another way is for when they are used as labels. The second column method is used much more often in American English than British English. The third column is used in British English but rarely in American English (although the use of the second and third columns is not necessarily directly interchangeable between the two regional variants). In other words, British English and American English can seemingly agree, but it depends on a specific situation (in this example, bus numbers).

Note: When a cheque (or check) is written, the number 100 is always written "one hundred". It is never "a hundred".

In American English, many students are taught, not to use the word and anywhere in the whole part of a number, so it is not used before the tens and ones. It is instead used as a verbal delimiter when dealing with compound numbers. Thus, instead of "three hundred and seventy-three," "three hundred seventy-three" would be said. Despite this rule, some Americans use the and in reading numbers containing tens and ones as an alternative variant.

Very large numbers
For numbers above a million, three main systems name numbers in English (for the use of prefixes such as kilo- for a thousand, mega- for a million, milli- for a thousandth, etc. see SI units):
the long scale (formerly used in British English but now less so) designates a system of numeric names in which a thousand million is called a milliard, and billion is used for a million million. This system is still used in several other European languages.
the short scale (always used in American English and almost invariably in British English) designates a system of numeric names in which a thousand million is called a billion, and the word milliard is not used.
the Indian numbering system, used widely in Indian subcontinent.

Many people have no direct experience of manipulating numbers this large, and many non-American readers may interpret billion as 1012 (even if they are young enough to have been taught otherwise at school); moreover, usage of the "long" billion is standard in some non-English speaking countries. For these reasons, defining the word may be advisable when writing for the public.

The numbers past one trillion in the short scale, in ascending powers of 1000, are as follows: quadrillion, quintillion, sextillion, septillion, octillion, nonillion, decillion, undecillion, duodecillion, tredecillion, quattuordecillion, quindecillion, sexdecillion, septendecillion, octodecillion, novemdecillion and vigintillion (which is 10 to the 63rd power, or a one followed by 63 zeros). The highest number in this series listed in modern dictionaries is centillion, which is 10 to the 303rd power.  The interim powers of one thousand between vigintillion and centillion do not have standardized names, nor do any higher powers, but there are many  extensions in use. The highest number listed in Robert Munafo's table of such unofficial names is milli-millillion, which was coined as a name for 10 to the 3,000,003rd power.

The googolplex was often cited as the largest named number in English. If a googol is ten to the one hundredth power, then a googolplex is one followed by a googol of zeros (that is, ten to the power of a googol). There is the coinage, of very little use, of ten to the googolplex power, of the word googolplexplex.

The terms arab, kharab, padm and shankh are more commonly found in old books on Indian mathematics.

Here are some approximate composite large numbers in American English:

Often, large numbers are written with (preferably non-breaking) half-spaces or thin spaces separating the thousands (and, sometimes, with normal spaces or apostrophes) instead of commas—to ensure that confusion is not caused in countries where a decimal comma is used. Thus, a million is often written 1 000 000.

In some areas, a point (. or ·) may also be used as a thousands separator, but then the decimal separator must be a comma. In English the point (.) is used as the decimal separator, and the comma as the thousands separator.

Special names

Some numbers have special names in addition to their regular names, most depending on context.

 0:
zero: formal scientific usage
 nought: mostly British usage, common in science to refer to subscript 0 indicating an initial state
naught: archaic term for nothingness, which may or may not be equivalent to the number; mostly American usage, old-fashioned spelling of nought
aught: proscribed but still occasionally used when a digit is 0 (as in "thirty-aught-six", the .30-06 Springfield rifle cartridge and by association guns that fire it). Aughts also refers to the decade of 2000-2009 in American English. 
oh: used when spelling numbers (like telephone, bank account, bus line [British: bus route]) but can cause confusion with the letter o if reading a mix of numbers and letters
nil: in general sport scores, British usage ("The score is two–nil.")
nothing: in general sport scores, American usage ("The score is two–nothing.")
null: to an object or idea related to nothingness. The 0th aleph number is pronounced "aleph-null".
love: in tennis, badminton, squash and similar sports (origin disputed, said by the Oxford English Dictionary to be from the idea that when one does a thing "for love", that is for no monetary gain, the word "love" implies "nothing".
zilch,  (from Spanish), zip: used informally when stressing nothingness; this is true especially in combination with one another ("You know nothing—zero, zip, zilch!"); American usage
nix: also used as a verb; mostly American usage
cypher / cipher: archaic, from French , in turn from Arabic , meaning zero
goose egg (informal)
duck (used in cricket when a batsman is dismissed without scoring)
blank the half of a domino tile with no pips
1:
 ace in certain sports and games, as in tennis or golf, indicating success with one stroke, and the face of a die, playing card or domino half with one pip
 birdie in golf denotes one stroke less than par, and bogey, one stroke more than par
 solo
 unit
 linear the degree of a polynomial is 1; also for explicitly denoting the first power of a unit: linear metre
 unity in mathematics
 protagonist first actor in theatre of Ancient Greece, similarly Proto-Isaiah and proton
2:
 couple
 brace, from Old French "arms" (the plural of arm), as in "what can be held in two arms".
 pair
 deuce the face of a die, playing card or domino half with two pips
 eagle in golf denotes two strokes less than par
 duo
 quadratic the degree of a polynomial is 2
 also square or squared for denoting the second power of a unit: square metre or metre squared
 penultimate, second from the end
 deuteragonist second actor in theatre of Ancient Greece, similarly Deutero-Isaiah and deuteron
3:
 trey the face of a die or playing card with three pips, a three-point field goal in basketball, nickname for the third carrier of the same personal name in a family 
 trio
 trips: three-of-a-kind in a poker hand. a player has three cards with the same numerical value
 cubic the degree of a polynomial is 3
 also cube or cubed for denoting the third power of a unit: cubic metre or metre cubed
 albatross in golf denotes three strokes less than par. Sometimes called double eagle
 hat-trick or hat trick: achievement of three feats in sport or other contexts
 antepenultimate third from the end
 tritagonist third actor in theatre of Ancient Greece, similarly Trito-Isaiah and triton
 turkey in bowling, three consecutive strikes
4:
 cater: (rare) the face of a die or playing card with four pips
 quartet
 quartic or biquadratic the degree of a polynomial is 4
 quad (short for quadruple or the like) several specialized sets of four, such as four of a kind in poker, a carburetor with four inputs, etc.,
 condor in golf denotes four strokes less than par 
 preantepenultimate fourth from the end
5:
 cinque or cinq (rare) the face of a die or playing card with five pips
 quintet
 nickel (informal American, from the value of the five-cent US nickel, but applied in non-monetary references)
 quintic the degree of a polynomial is 5
 quint (short for quintuplet or the like) several specialized sets of five, such as quintuplets, etc.
6:
 half a dozen
 sice (rare) the face of a die or playing card with six pips
 sextet
 sextic or hectic the degree of a polynomial is 6
7:
 septet
 septic or heptic the degree of a polynomial is 7
8:
 octet
9:
 nonet
10:
 dime (informal American, from the value of the ten-cent US dime, but applied in non-monetary references)
 decet
decade, used for years but also other groups of 10 as in rosary prayers or Braille symbols
 11: a banker's dozen
 12: a dozen (first power of the duodecimal base), used mostly in commerce
 13: a baker's dozen
 20: a score (first power of the vigesimal base), nowadays archaic; famously used in the opening of the Gettysburg Address: "Four score and seven years ago..." The Number of the Beast in the King James Bible is rendered "Six hundred threescore and six".  Also in The Book of Common Prayer, Psalm 90 as used in the Burial Service—"The days of our age are threescore years and ten; ...."
50: half-century, literally half of a hundred, usually used in cricket scores.
55: double-nickel (informal American)
60: a shock: historical commercial count, described as "three scores".
100:
A century, also used in cricket scores and in cycling for 100 miles.
A ton, in Commonwealth English, the speed of 100 mph or 100 km/h.
A small hundred or short hundred (archaic, see 120 below)
120:
A great hundred or long hundred (twelve tens; as opposed to the small hundred, i.e. 100 or ten tens), also called small gross (ten dozens), both archaic
Also sometimes referred to as duodecimal hundred, although that could literally also mean 144, which is twelve squared
 144: a gross (a dozen dozens, second power of the duodecimal base), used mostly in commerce
 500: a ream
 1000: 
a grand, colloquially used especially when referring to money, also in fractions and multiples, e.g. half a grand, two grand, etc. Grand can also be shortened to "G" in many cases.
K, originally from the abbreviation of kilo-, e.g. "He only makes $20K a year."
Millennium (plural: millennia), a period of one thousand years.
kilo- (Greek for "one thousand"), a decimal unit prefix in the Metric system denoting multiplication by "one thousand". For example: 1 kilometre = 1000 metres.
 1728: a great gross (a dozen gross, third power of the duodecimal base), used historically in commerce
 10,000: a myriad (a hundred hundred), commonly used in the sense of an indefinite very high number
 100,000: a lakh (a hundred thousand), in Indian English
 10,000,000: a crore (a hundred lakh), in Indian English and written as 100,00,000.
 10100: googol (1 followed by 100 zeros), used in mathematics 
 10googol: googolplex (1 followed by a googol of zeros)
 10googolplex: googolplexplex (1 followed by a googolplex of zeros)

Combinations of numbers in most sports scores are read as in the following examples:
 1–0    British English: one-nil; American English: one-nothing, one-zip, or one-zero
 0–0    British English: nil-nil or  nil all; American English: zero-zero or nothing-nothing, (occasionally scoreless or no score)
 2–2    two-two or two all; American English also twos, two to two, even at two, or two up.

Naming conventions of Tennis scores (and related sports) are different from other sports.

The centuries of Italian culture have names in English borrowed from Italian: 
 duecento "(one thousand and) two hundred" for the years 1200 to 1299, or approximately 13th century
 trecento 14th century
 quattrocento 15th century
 cinquecento 16th century
 seicento 17th century
 settecento 18th century
 ottocento 19th century
 novecento 20th century
 ventesimo 21st century

When reading numbers in a sequence, such as a telephone or serial number, British people will usually use the terms double followed by the repeated number. Hence 007 is double oh seven. Exceptions are the emergency telephone number 999, which is always nine nine nine and the apocalyptic "Number of the Beast", which is always six six six. In the US, 911 (the US emergency telephone number) is usually read nine one one, while 9/11 (in reference to the September 11, 2001, attacks) is usually read nine eleven.

Multiplicative adverbs and adjectives 

A few numbers have specialised multiplicative numbers (adverbs), also called adverbial numbers, which express how many times some event happens:

Compare these specialist multiplicative numbers to express how many times some thing exists (adjectives):

English also has some multipliers and distributive numbers, such as singly.

Other examples are given in the Specialist Numbers.

Negative numbers
The name of a negative number is the name of the corresponding positive number preceded by "minus" or (American English) "negative". Thus −5.2 is "minus five point two" or "negative five point two". For temperatures, North Americans colloquially say "below"—short for "below zero"—so a temperature of −5° is "five below" (in contrast, for example, to "two above" for 2°). This is occasionally used for emphasis when referring to several temperatures or ranges both positive and negative. This is particularly common in Canada where the use of Celsius in weather forecasting means that temperatures can regularly drift above and below zero at certain times of year.

Ordinal numbers

Ordinal numbers refer to a position in a series. Common ordinals include:

Zeroth only has a meaning when counting starts with zero, which happens in a mathematical or computer science context. Ordinal numbers predate the invention of zero and positional notation.

Ordinal numbers such as 21st, 33rd, etc., are formed by combining a cardinal ten with an ordinal unit.

Higher ordinals are not often written in words, unless they are round numbers (thousandth, millionth, billionth). They are written with digits and letters as described below. Some rules should be borne in mind.
 The suffixes -th, -st, -nd and -rd are occasionally written superscript above the number itself.
 If the tens digit of a number is 1, then "th" is written after the number. For example: 13th, 19th, 112th, 9,311th.
 If the tens digit is not equal to 1, then the following table could be used:

For example: 2nd, 7th, 20th, 23rd, 52nd, 135th, 301st.

These ordinal abbreviations are actually hybrid contractions of a numeral and a word. 1st is "1" + "st" from "first". Similarly, "nd" is used for "second" and "rd" for "third". In the legal field and in some older publications, the ordinal abbreviation for "second" and "third" is simply "d".
For example: 42d, 33d, 23d.

NB: "D" still often denotes "second" and "third" in the numeric designations of units in the US armed forces, for example, 533d Squadron, and in legal citations for the second and third series of case reporters.

Dates

There are a number of ways to read years. The following table offers a list of valid pronunciations and alternate pronunciations for any given year of the Gregorian calendar.

Twelve thirty-four would be the norm on both sides of the Atlantic for the year 1234. The years 2000 to 2009 are most often read as two thousand, two thousand (and) one and the like by both British and American speakers. For years after 2009, twenty eleven, twenty fourteen, etc. are more common, even in years earlier than 2009 BC/BCE. Likewise, the years after 1009 (until 1099) are also read in the same manner (e.g. 1015 is either ten fifteen or, rarely, one thousand fifteen). Some Britons read years within the 1000s to 9000s BC/BCE in the American manner, that is, 1234 BC is read as twelve (hundred and) thirty-four BC, while 2400 BC can be read as either two thousand four hundred or twenty four hundred BC.

Collective numbers 
Collective numbers are numbers that refer to a group of a specific size. Words like "pair" and "dozen" are common in English, though most are formally derived from Greek and Latin numerals, as follows:

Fractions and decimals

Numbers used to denote the denominator of a fraction are known linguistically as "partitive numerals". In spoken English, ordinal numerals and partitive numerals are identical with a few exceptions. Thus "fifth" can mean the element between fourth and sixth, or the fraction created by dividing the unit into five pieces. When used as a partitive numeral, these forms can be pluralized: one seventh, two sevenths. The sole exceptions to this rule are division by one, two, and sometimes four: "first" and "second" cannot be used for a fraction with a denominator of one or two. Instead, "whole" and "half" (plural "halves") are used. For a fraction with a denominator of four, either "fourth" or "quarter" may be used.

Here are some common English fractions, or partitive numerals:

Alternatively, and for greater numbers, one may say for 1/2 "one over two", for 5/8 "five over eight", and so on. This "over" form is also widely used in mathematics.

Fractions together with an integer are read as follows:

1½ is "one and a half"
6¼ is "six and a quarter"
7⅝ is "seven and five eighths"

A space is required between the whole number and the fraction; however, if a special fraction character is used like "½", then the space can be done without, e.g.

 9 1/2
 9½

Numbers with a decimal point may be read as a cardinal number, then "and", then another cardinal number followed by an indication of the significance of the second cardinal number (mainly U.S.); or as a cardinal number, followed by "point", and then by the digits of the fractional part. The indication of significance takes the form of the denominator of the fraction indicating division by the smallest power of ten larger than the second cardinal. This is modified when the first cardinal is zero, in which case neither the zero nor the "and" is pronounced, but the zero is optional in the "point" form of the fraction.

Some American and Canadian schools teach students to pronounce decimaly written fractions (for example, .5) as though they were longhand fractions (five tenths), such as thirteen and seven tenths for 13.7. This formality is often dropped in common speech and is steadily disappearing in instruction in mathematics and science as well as in international American schools. In the U.K., and among most North Americans, 13.7 would be read thirteen point seven.

For example:

0.002 is "point zero zero two", "point oh oh two", "nought point zero zero two", etc.; or "two thousandths" (U.S., occasionally)
3.1416 is "three point one four one six"
99.3 is "ninety-nine point three"; or "ninety-nine and three tenths" (U.S., occasionally).

In English the decimal point was originally printed in the center of the line (0·002), but with the advent of the typewriter it was placed at the bottom of the line, so that a single key could be used as a full stop/period and as a decimal point. In many non-English languages a full-stop/period at the bottom of the line is used as a thousands separator with a comma being used as the decimal point.

Whether or not digits or words are used

With few exceptions, most grammatical texts rule that the numbers zero to nine inclusive should be "written out" – instead of "1" and "2", one would write "one" and "two".

Example: "I have two apples." (Preferred)
Example: "I have 2 apples."

After "nine", one can head straight back into the 10, 11, 12, etc., although some write out the numbers until "twelve".
Example: "I have 28 grapes." (Preferred)
Example: "I have twenty-eight grapes."

Another common usage is to write out any number that can be expressed as one or two words, and use figures otherwise.

Examples:
"There are six million dogs." (Preferred)
"There are 6,000,000 dogs."
"That is one hundred and twenty-five oranges." (British English)
"That is one hundred twenty-five oranges." (US-American English)
"That is 125 oranges." (Preferred)

Numbers at the beginning of a sentence should also be written out, or the sentence rephrased.

The above rules are not always followed. In literature, larger numbers might be spelled out. On the other hand, digits might be more commonly used in technical or financial articles, where many figures are discussed. In particular, the two different forms should not be used for figures that serve the same purpose; for example, it is inelegant to write, "Between day twelve and day 15 of the study, the population doubled."

Empty numbers

Colloquial English's small vocabulary of empty numbers can be employed when there is uncertainty as to the precise number to use, but it is desirable to define a general range:  specifically, the terms "umpteen", "umpty", and "zillion".  These are derived etymologically from the range affixes:
 "-teen" (designating the range as being between 13 and 19 inclusive)
 "-ty" (designating the range as being between 20 and 90 inclusive)
 "-illion" (designating the range as being above 1,000,000; or, more generally, as being extremely large).

The prefix "ump-" is added to the first two suffixes to produce the empty numbers "umpteen" and "umpty":  it is of uncertain origin.  A noticeable absence of an empty number is in the hundreds range.

Usage of empty numbers:
 The word "umpteen" may be used as an adjective, as in "I had to go to umpteen stores to find shoes that fit."  It can also be used to modify a larger number, usually "million", as in "Umpteen million people watched the show; but they still cancelled it."
 "Umpty" is not in common usage.  It can appear in the form "umpty-one" (paralleling the usage in such numbers as "twenty-one"), as in "There are umpty-one ways to do it wrong." "Umpty-ump" is also heard, though "ump" is never used by itself.
  The word "zillion" may be used as an adjective, modifying a noun.  The noun phrase normally contains the indefinite article "a", as in "There must be a zillion pages on the World Wide Web."
  The plural "zillions" designates a number indefinitely larger than "millions" or "billions".  In this case, the construction is parallel to the one for "millions" or "billions", with the number used as a plural count noun, followed by a prepositional phrase with "of", as in "There are zillions of grains of sand on the beaches of the world."
  Empty numbers are sometimes made up, with obvious meaning: "squillions" is obviously an empty, but very large, number; a "squintillionth" would be a very small number.
  Some empty numbers may be modified by actual numbers, such as "four zillion", and are used for jest, exaggeration, or to relate abstractly to actual numbers.
  Empty numbers are colloquial, and primarily used in oral speech or informal contexts.  They are inappropriate in formal or scholarly usage.

See also Placeholder name.

See also

Indefinite and fictitious numbers
List of numbers
Long and short scales
Names of large numbers
Natural number
Number prefixes and their derivatives

References

External links

English Numbers - explanations, exercises and number generator (cardinal and ordinal numbers)

Numerals
Naming conventions
American and British English differences